Hatim ibn Arif al-Awni (born 1966) is a Saudi Arabian Islamic scholar and Hanbali traditionalist. Born in Ta'if to a Sharifian family, al-Awni completed his BA, MA and PhD in Sharia at the College of Da'wah and Fundamentals of Religion at Umm al-Qura University, where he later became Associate Professor. He was appointed as a member of the Consultative Assembly of Saudi Arabia, serving two terms between 12 April 2005 and 10 January 2013. A student of Nasir al-Din al-Albani, his research focuses on hadith studies. Al-Awni advocates for a reformed Wahhabism which he envisages as a "correctionist movement".

Theological views 
Al-Awni argues that some Wahhabi and Salafi clerics definition of worship (ibadah) is incorrect, stating it is a "specific action of the heart" and emphasizing the importance of intentions. Therefore, he says, they have misunderstood what constitutes shirk in worship and wrongly takfir others, including Shias.

He also argues for limited freedom of thought, where people would be free to hold views as long as they do not encourage criminal acts, exploit ignorance or undermine the "fundamentals of religion". According to him, this would allow for "true dialogue" that would, among other benefits, encourage fruitful debate and correct unreasonable beliefs. Without this, he states, hypocrisy becomes widespread and one can not achieve true certainty in their faith as they cannot know if it is built upon secure arguments. In addition, al-Awni opines that an Islamic society can accommodate both religions considered to have man-made and divine origins.

In al-Awni's view, the doctrine of al-Wala' wal-Bara' is fundamental to belief, but does not preclude acting judiciously and humanely to unbelievers who are peaceful toward Muslims.

Views on ISIS 
On 3 August 2014, al-Awni published an essay entitled "The Lazy Scholars", in which he criticised the Saudi religious establishment for "lazily" responding to the Islamic State of Iraq and the Levant (ISIS). He also alleged their quarrel with the group was political rather than theological, claiming their approach to takfir is identical. In an interview for Al-Hayat later that month, he suggested that "extremist" views within a classical Wahhabi work, ad-Durar as-Saniyyah, should be corrected. Soon afterwards, the Council of Senior Scholars dismissed the notion that extremism stemmed from such texts. In response to his criticism of the group, ISIS declared al-Awni an apostate and called for his killing through their magazine, Dabiq.

Selected publications 

 Al-ʾIbadah: Bawābat al-Tawḥīd wā-Bawābat al-Takfīr ("Worship: Gateway to Tawhid and to Takfir") 
 Takfīr Ahl al-Shahadātayn ("Excommunicating the People of the Two Testimonials")
 Istīʾab al-Islām li al-ʾAdyān al-Mukhtalifa wa li Tanawuʾ al-Hiḍarat ("The Accommodation of Islam of Different Religions and Diverse Civilizations")

See also 
 Sahwa movement
 Salman al-Ouda

References

External links 
 Official website
 Twitter

1966 births
Dhawu Awn
Umm al-Qura University alumni
Academic staff of Umm al-Qura University
Living people
21st-century Muslim scholars of Islam
Saudi Arabian Sunni Muslim scholars of Islam